The 1993 edition of the Campeonato Carioca was kicked off on February 7, 1993 and ended on June 27, 1993. It is the official tournament organized by FFERJ (Federação de Futebol do Estado do Rio de Janeiro, or Rio de Janeiro State Football Federation. Only clubs based in the Rio de Janeiro State are allowed to play. Twenty-four teams contested this edition. Vasco da Gama won the title for the 19th time. twelve teams were relegated.

System
The tournament would be divided in three stages:
 Taça Guanabara: The twenty-four teams were divided into two groups of twelve. each team played in a single round-robin format against the teams of their group. The champion of Group A qualified to the Finals. The bottom two teams of Group A were relegated to Group B and the top two teams of Group B were promoted to Group A. 
 Taça Rio: The twenty-four teams were divided into two groups of twelve. each team all played in a single round-robin format against the teams of their group. The champion of Group A qualified to the Finals. The bottom two teams of Group A were relegated to the Second Level, along with the bottom ten teams of Group B.
 Finals: The Finals were disputed in a best of four points series, with the team with the best season record receiving one bonus point.

Championship

Taça Guanabara

Group A

Group B

Taça Rio

Group A

Group B

Finals

References

Campeonato Carioca seasons
Carioca